Beth Lapides is a writer, comedian, producer and host, best known for creating Un-Cabaret.

Un-Cabaret
Lapides is the creator, host and producer of Un-Cabaret, a live show that has become widely acknowledged as the first alt-comedy show and a critical venue for the Los Angeles "alternative comedy" movement. Lapides wrote about it for an LA Weekly cover story on the occasion of the 25th Anniversary Show for CAP/UCLA at the Theatre at Ace Hotel.

Un-Cabaret is known for its intimate, conversational style and has been a launching or relaunching pad for some of the most innovative voices in comedy. The Un- stands for un-homophobic, un-xenophobic, un-misogynistic, un-hacky.

The Un-Cabaret posse includes Patton Oswalt, Bob Odenkirk, Margaret Cho, Sandra Bernhard, Janeane Garofalo, David Cross, Merrill Markoe, Andy Dick, Andy Kindler, Taylor Negron, Judy Toll, Scott Thompson, Jeff Garlin, Julia Sweeney, Laura Kightlinger, Greg Behrendt, Karen Kilgariff, Terry Sweeney, Tig Notaro, Jen Kirkman, Rory Scovel, Rob Delaney, Baron Vaughn, Byron Bowers, Lauren Weedman, Julie Goldman, Michael Patrick King, Judd Apatow, Larry Charles, Sklar Brothers, Ellen Cleghorn, Alex Edelman, Erin Foley, Justin Sayre, Drew Droege, Sam Pancake, Moon Zappa, Alec Mapa, Kira Soltanovich, Paul F. Tompkins, etc.

Un-Cabaret has produced five critically acclaimed CD's including The Un and Only. Spinoff productions from Un-Cabaret have include Say the Word, a story-telling show; The Other Network, a show featuring unaired pilots, and the UnCab Lab, a student workshop.

Recordings from Un-Cabaret have been featured on This American Life.

Un-Cabaret was produced as a special for Comedy Central. And there are four on Amazon. Notable shows that emerged from Un-Cabaret include Julia Sweeney's God Said Ha! and Laura Kightlinger's book Quick Shots of False Hope.

Writing
Lapides has written for O, The Oprah Magazine, Time, Los Angeles Times, Premiere, The Realist, Elle Decor, etc. Links to writing can be found here.

She has written commentaries for NPR's All Things Considered.

Lapides's first book Did I Wake You?: Haikus for Modern Living was published in 2007.

She blogs about writing, creativity and life, is at work on her next books and has scripted projects in development.

She has developed projects with John Riggi for Oxygen, and Evolution Film and Tape for Warner Brothers, HBO and Disney.

She created So You Need to Decide an audiobook original that humorously and insightfully discusses complex life decisions. Published by Recorded Books in January 2022, contributors include many high-profile comedy and performance personalities such as: Bob Odenkirk, Margaret Cho, Julia Sweeney, Isaac Mizrahi, and Phoebe Bridgers.

Host 
Lapides has hosted Un-Cabaret live and in all media since its inception. This has included residencies in nine Los Angeles venues including weekly runs at LunaPark, The Knitting Factory, HBO Workspace, First and Hope and since January 2018, a monthly residency at Rockwell Table and Stage. She has also hosted the show on the road, on Comedy Central and on Amazon.

Lapides' podcast Life and Beth is half hour conversations in which guests are asked to talk about the stories that most make them them. Beth's guest have included Lily Taylor, Willem Dafoe, Margaret Cho, Daniel Radcliffe, Ana Gasteyer and others. Her radio show, The Beth Lapides Experience, ran for a year on the short-lived Comedy World Radio. In addition she hosted Radio UnCabaret for the network.

Lapides hosted The Couch, a talk show pilot for MTV. It was greenlit and then cancelled and replaced by The Tom Green Show.

Lapides hosted two Un-Cabaret spin off shows, Say The Word and The Other Network Festival of Unaired Pilots. In the former, TV writers read stories of their lives, in which Lapides was also a featured reader. The latter toured nationally and to the Just For Laughs Festival. It featured pilots by Judd Apatow, Bob Odenkirk and others who also told the story of creating the shows and their cancellations. Lapides' inspiration for them was her own failed pilot and the process of seeing her friends hopes swell and be dashed.

Lapides hosts an occasional series of conversations for the West Hollywood Lesbian Speaker Series. Her guest have included Stephanie Miller, Allee Willis, Judy Gold, Fortune Feimster and Margaret Cho.

Theatre
Lapides has been a creative force in the solo show arena. She began her career in the downtown NY art scene of the 1980s where she created pieces for The Kitchen, PS 122, Club 57, Danceteria, and others. She received several National Endowment for the Arts grants and toured to theaters, universities and art centers like ICA Boston, ICA London, Oberlin College, University of Iowa, Hallwalls etc.

She has continued to create solo work throughout her career and she continues to develop her latest piece "100% Happy 88% of The Time" which has toured to the Improv Lab in LA, 92nd St Y Tribeca and The Triad in NY, Kripalu, The Myrna Loy Center for the Arts, Club Oberon in Boston among others.

Stand up comedy 
Lapides has devoted most of her time as a stand up comedienne to her work at Un-Cabaret but she has also worked in countless comedy clubs including The Improv, The Laugh Factory, The Comedy Store, Comedy U, The Comic Strip.

She has appeared on Comedy Central on Women Aloud and multiple appearances on Politically Incorrect.

She has appeared on any number of comedy podcasts including one hosted by The Sklar Brothers, Greg Behrendt, Eddie Pepitone, Greg Fitzsimmons.

First Lady campaign 
Lapides ran a satirical 1992 campaign to make First Lady an elected position. She was featured on CNN, The Montel Williams Show and was invited to be on Oprah. People magazine, the Los Angeles Times, and Interview magazine all covered the campaign. She received as many electoral votes as Ross Perot.

Filmography
Lapides appeared in the Sex and the City TV series as a performance artist Marina Abramowitz in the "One" episode (2003), in which Carrie meets Aleskander. Lapides wrote a piece for the New York Times Magazine about it, which was killed the night before publication.

Press 
"A born raconteur, a master comedian!" LA Times
"Hysterical!" NPR
"A completely unique stand up theater artist!" Hollywood Reporter
"Inspired... brilliant.... original... fun! The high priestess of alternative comedy!" LA Weekly
"A breath of fresh air! Funny, enlivening! Imaginative and unusually positive!" Whole Life Times
"Hot!" Playboy
"Wild, freewheeling, unforgettable! One of a kind stage presence!"The Boston Globe
"Her show is a hilarious marve!" The Out London
"Sublime!" KXLU

Teaching and coaching 
Lapides is a master teacher. Her comedy, creativity and writing workshops have been presented by UCLA Extension, Second City Chicago, Kripalu Center for Yoga and Health, mediabistro and others.

Her Los Angeles workshop meets seasonally.

Her workshops have evolved through various iterations: The UnCab Lab, The Comedian's Way, The Beth Lapides Workshop, How To Be The Funniest You and Infinite Writing. She also works privately with clients.

Art 
Lapides began her career as a visual artist in New York.  Her work was shown at Dance Theater Workshop and The Metropolitan Museum of Art Library among others. Her more recent work has been featured in film and television.

References

External links

Living people
Year of birth missing (living people)
American women comedians
Comedians from New York (state)
21st-century American women